The 1984 NCAA Division I Men's Soccer Tournament was the 25th organized men's college soccer tournament by the National Collegiate Athletic Association, to determine the top college soccer team in the United States.

The Clemson Tigers won their first national title by defeating two-time defending champion Indiana Hoosiers in the championship game, 2–1.

The final was held on 16 December 1984, at the Kingdome in Seattle, Washington. All the other games were played at the home field of the higher seeded team.

Early rounds
Home teams are indicated by * or seed

Final – Kingdome, Seattle, Washington

See also  
 NCAA Division II Men's Soccer Championship
 NCAA Division III Men's Soccer Championship
 NAIA Men's Soccer Championship

References

NCAA Division I Men's Soccer Tournament seasons
Championship
Soccer in Seattle
Sports competitions in Seattle
December 1984 sports events in the United States
1980s in Seattle
1984 in sports in Washington (state)